Fatehpur is a village in Fatehpur CD block in the Jamtara Sadar subdivision of the Jamtara district in the Indian state of Jharkhand.

Geography

Location

Overview
The map shows a large area, which is a plateau with low hills, except in the eastern portion where the Rajmahal hills intrude into this area and the Ramgarh hills are there. The south-western portion is just a rolling upland. The entire area is overwhelmingly rural with only small pockets of urbanisation.

Note: The full screen map is interesting. All places marked on the map are linked in the full screen map and one can easily move on to another page of his/her choice. Enlarge the full screen map to see what else is there – one gets railway connections, many more road connections and so on.

Area

Demographics
According to the 2011 Census of India, Fatehpur had a total population of 4,107, of which 2,111 (51%) were males and 1,996 (49%) were females. Population in the age range 0–6 years was 606. The total number of literate persons in Fatehpur was 3,501 (73.61% of the population over 6 years).

Civic administration

Police station
There is a police station at Fatehpur.

CD block HQ
Headquarters of Fatehpur CD block is at Fatehpur village.

Education
Government High School Fatehpur is a hindi medium coeducational institution established in 1954. It has facilities for teaching in classes IX and X.

Saraswati Shishu Vidya Mandir is a coeducational institution established in 11 February 1990. It has facilities for teaching from class Shishu Pravesh to class 10th.

References

Villages in Jamtara district